The Southby Baronetcy, of Burford in the County of Oxford, is a title in the Baronetage of the United Kingdom. It was created on 12 June 1937 for Archibald Southby, Conservative Member of Parliament for Epsom. The second Baronet was a cricketer.

Southby baronets, of Burford (1937)
Sir Archibald Richard James Southby, 1st Baronet (1886–1969)
Sir (Archibald) Richard Charles Southby, 2nd Baronet (1910–1988)
Sir John Richard Bilbe Southby, 3rd Baronet (born 1948)

Notes

References 
Kidd, Charles, Williamson, David (editors). Debrett's Peerage and Baronetage (1990 edition). New York: St Martin's Press, 1990, 

Baronetcies in the Baronetage of the United Kingdom